Arnold Coster (born Arnold Schiedam, 1976, Netherlands) is a Dutch mountaineer.

Educated as a mechanical engineer, he became intensely involved with climbing at a young age when he started climbing in the Alps. He moved to Nepal in 2003 to follow his passion of mountaineering.

Coster has summited 5 of the 14 peaks above 8000m. In 2010 he became the first person from the Netherlands to summit Makalu (8481 m).

Arnold Coster is currently living full time in Kathmandu, Nepal.

Expeditions led

References

See also
List of Mount Everest summiters by number of times to the summit
List of Mount Everest guides

1976 births
Living people
Dutch mountain climbers